Commercially useful enzymes (CUEs) are enzymes which have commercial uses.  Microbial enzymes have well-known applications as biocatalysts in several areas of industry, such as biotechnology, agriculture, pharmaceuticals, etc. Metagenomic data provide a unique resource for discovering novel commercially useful enzymes (CUEs) from yet unidentified microbes belonging to complex microbial communities in diverse ecosystems.

Classification
A set of 510 CUEs was manually curated using publicly available information and classified into nine broad application categories based on their function. By comprehensive homology-based mining of ten diverse publicly available metagenomic data sources, several novel CUEs, homologous to those in the set of known CUEs, were identified. Using this strategy, a comprehensive Metagenomic BioMining Engine (MetaBioME) platform to facilitate homology-based computational identification of homologs for known CUEs from metagenomic datasets is developed. This is a useful resource to identify novel homologs to the existing known CUEs and to also identify new ones, both of which can be used as leads for further experimental verification.
This is available at MetaBioME.

References

 

Enzymes